Lefteris Gialousis (born 18 July 1985) is a Greek football defender who plays for Greek club Almyros Gazi in the Heraklion FCA A1 Championship, a regional league in the fifth tier of the Greek football league system.

Professional career
Gialousis began his career playing with local Heraklion side Irodotos, in the Gamma and Delta Ethniki. After three-and-a-half seasons with Irodotos, the more prominent Heraklion clubs had taken notice of his performances, and during the winter transfer window of the 2006–07 season Gialousis signed with Greek Super League club Ergotelis.  Gialousis did however not make an appearance for the club in the season. In the 2007–08 season, Gialousis made his Super League debut on 16 February 2008, playing all 90 minutes in a 1–0 loss to Greek champions Olympiacos at Karaiskakis Stadium. After a fine performance against Olympiacos, Gialousis kept his place in the starting XI of the team for the rest of the season. He went on to make 78 appearances in the Superleague with Ergotelis within a span of six years before departing the club in 2012, having scored one goal.

Οn 13 July 2012, Gialousis signed a contract with Asteras Tripoli. He made a total of 9 appearances for the club before his contract was terminated. On 16 July 2013, Gialousis signed with Greek Football League club Olympiakos Volou. He remained with the club for two seasons making a total of 63 appearances and scoring 2 goals. On 6 August 2015, Gialousis returned to Ergotelis, playing in the Greek Football League and was one of the 17 players who still remained in the club's roster despite financial issues, which ultimately forced the club to withdraw from professional competitions.

References

External links
 Ergotelis official website

1985 births
Living people
Irodotos FC players
Ergotelis F.C. players
Asteras Tripolis F.C. players
Olympiacos Volos F.C. players
Association football fullbacks
Footballers from Heraklion
Greek footballers